Manjrod is a village in a Shirpur Taluka of Dhule district, Maharashtra. It is located on bank of Tapi river. Manjrod is 70 km from the city of Dhule.
The major occupation of the people is agriculture with cotton as the major product.

Transportation
The nearest prominent railway stations on the main route are Bhusaval and Chaalisgaon. Nardana (Taluka Sindkheda & Amalner is the nearest station. Bus service is available to Bhusaval, Gujarat and MP state.

History
Due to floods of 1950-60 Manjrod (old Manjrod) was relocated to new place (new Manjrod). Ram Temple which was in old Manjrod is recently relocated to New Manjrod.

Religion
Manjrod is a village of temples. 
Villagers recently constructed Ram Mandir near Gram Panchayat office. 
Tunnel of Ganpati is situated at the bank of Tapi river, it is said to be only tunnel of Ganpati in Maharshtra. The Ganpati idol is made of shadu mati(clay) and it is there since ages. 
Shri Krishna Temple in Bombay galli is holy place for Mahanubhav followers.

Education
Primary education (up to  4th Standard) : ZP school. 
Secondary education (up to 10th Standard) : Mahatma Gandhi Vidyalay

Old Manjrod Images

See also
 Shirpur

References

External links
  Manjrod
  Manjrod in veethi pages.

Villages in Dhule district